Joseph Enzweiler (October 21, 1950 – April 16, 2011) was an American poet who lived in Fairbanks, Alaska.

Biography
Enzweiler was born in Cincinnati and grew up in Madeira, Ohio. He graduated from Xavier University in 1973 with a Bachelor’s of Science in Physics and received his Master’s of Science in Physics from the University of Alaska Fairbanks in 1981. He settled in Fairbanks, building his own cabin and supporting himself through part-time work as a stonemason and carpenter to devote his time to writing.

he had six books of poetry published, as well as a memoir of his time in Alaska. His books were “Home Country”, “Stonework of the Sky”, “A Curb in Eden”, “A Curb in Eden: New Version”, “The Man Who Ordered Perch”, and “A Winter on Earth”. Before his death, Enzweiler also finished his memoir “We All Worship Something”, where he recollects his time in Fairbanks during the pipeline boom in the late 1900s. His literary works have been featured in several sources including The Writer’s Almanac and Verse Daily.  His literary works covered topics including family, friendship, and life in Alaska.

He conducted workshops through various local venues such as the UAF’s Midnight Sun Visiting Writer series, the Fairbanks Arts Association Reading series, and the Adult Learning Program of Alaska. He was also active in the Southern Appalachian Writers Cooperative and has been featured in live radio interviews such as Around Cincinnati.

He was married to Dr Karen Grossweiner. In 2009, he was diagnosed with a brain tumor. He died on April 16, 2011.

References

 Allen, Lowell. Asheville Poetry Review. http://www.ashevillepoetryreview.com/ ?s=joseph+enzweiler/ Accessed 17 November 2016
 Caldwell, Suzanna. “Poet, former Fairbanksan Joe Enzweiler dies.” Newsminer, 2011,
www.newsminer.com/poet-former-fairbanksan-joe-enzweiler-dies/article
 Enzweiler, Joseph. “Artist’s Statement.” February 2009.
 Gray, Barbara. Interview with Joseph Enzweiler. Around Cincinnati
www.josephenzweiler.com/101109_JoeEnzweiler.mp3 Accessed 18 November 2016
 Grossweiner, Dr. Karen. Interview on Joseph Enzweiler Jeremy Weaver and Edwin Lee. 28
November 2016.
 “Joseph Enzweiler, Poet and Friend, 1950-2011.” UC Gardner Neuroscience Institute, 2011,
www.ucgardnerneuroscienceinstitute.com/blog/joseph-enzweiler-poet-and-friend-
1950-2011/ Accessed 16 November 2016
 Schaber, Greg. “Northern Lights.” Xavier Magazine, 2009,
    www.xtra.xavier.edu/xavier-magazine/northern-lights/ Accessed 17 November 2016
 The Official Website of Alaskan Poet Joseph Enzweiler. www.josephenzweiler.com/ Accessed 14 November 2016

1950 births
2011 deaths
Writers from Fairbanks, Alaska
20th-century American poets
21st-century American poets
University of Alaska Fairbanks alumni
Xavier University alumni
People from Madeira, Ohio